The following outline is provided as an overview of and topical guide to Mars:

Mars – fourth planet from the Sun and the second-smallest planet in the Solar System, after Mercury. Named after the Roman god of war, it is often referred to as the "Red Planet" because the iron oxide prevalent on its surface gives it a reddish appearance. Mars is a terrestrial planet with a thin atmosphere, having surface features reminiscent both of the impact craters of the Moon and the valleys, deserts, and polar ice caps of Earth.

Classification of Mars 

 Astronomical object
 Gravitationally rounded object
 Planet
 Planet of the Solar System
 Inner planet
 Superior planet
 Terrestrial planet

Location of Mars 

 Milky Way Galaxy – barred spiral galaxy
 Orion Arm – a spiral arm of the Milky Way
 Solar System – the Sun and the objects that orbit it, including 8 planets, the 4th planet from the Sun being Mars
 Orbit of Mars

Features of Mars 

 Atmosphere of Mars
 Circulation
 Climate of Mars
 Martian surface
 Geography of Mars
 Outflow channels
 Geology of Mars
 Martian dichotomy
 Martian polar ice caps
 Solar eclipses on Mars
 Orbit of Mars

Surface of Mars 

Martian surface
 Concentric crater fill
 Dark slope streak
 Dust Devil Tracks
 Lineated valley fill
 Mars surface color
 Martian geyser
 Martian soil
 Scalloped topography
 Seasonal flows on warm Martian slopes
 Swiss cheese features
 Valley networks (Mars)
 Water on Mars
 Glaciers on Mars
 Groundwater on Mars

Landforms on Mars 

 Martian chaos terrain
 Areas of chaos terrain on Mars
 Chasmata on Mars
 Craters on Mars
 Gullies on Mars
 Labes on Mars
 Mountains on Mars
 Quadrangles on Mars
 Plains on Mars
 Valles on Mars
 Surface features of Mars seen by the Spirit rover

Natural satellites of Mars 

Moons of Mars
 Phobos
 Phobos monolith
 Transit of Phobos from Mars
 Deimos

History of Mars 

 History of Mars observation
 Martian canals
 List of Martian canals
 Classical albedo features on Mars
 Timeline of discoveries of water on Mars
 Lakes on Mars

Exploration of Mars 

Exploration of Mars
 Mars aircraft
 Mars analogs
 Artificial objects on Mars
 Mars atmospheric entry
 Mars Direct
 Mars Exploration Joint Initiative
 Mars flyby
 Mars landing
 Life on Mars
 Martian meteorite
 Mars Ocean Hypothesis
 Rocks on Mars 
 Mars rover
 Mars Scout Program

Flyby and direct missions to explore Mars 

Missions to Mars
 Mars program
 Mars 1
 Mars 2
 Mars 3
 Mariner program
 Mariner 3
 Mariner 4
 Mariner 6 and 7
 Mariner 8
 Mariner 9
 Zond program
 Zond 2
 Viking program
 Viking 1
 Viking 2
 Phobos program
 Mars Observer
 Mars Pathfinder
 Sojourner
 Mars Global Surveyor
 Mars Climate Orbiter
 Mars Polar Lander
 Deep Space 2
 2001 Mars Odyssey
 Nozomi spacecraft
 Mars Express
 Beagle 2
 Mars Exploration Rover
 Spirit rover
 Opportunity rover
 Mars Reconnaissance Orbiter
 Rosetta spacecraft
 Phoenix spacecraft
 Dawn spacecraft
 Mars Science Laboratory
Curiosity rover
 MAVEN
Mars Orbiter Mission
Exomars Program
 ExoMars Trace Gas Orbiter
Schiaparelli lander
Insight lander
Mars 2020
Perseverance rover
Ingenuity helicopter
Emirates Mars Mission
Tianwen-1
Tianwen-1 Orbiter
Tianwen-1 Deployable Camera
Tianwen-1 lander
Zhurong rover

Proposed missions to explore Mars 

 ExoMars
Kazachok Lander Platform
Rosalind Franklin rover
 Mars sample return mission
 Human mission to Mars
 List of crewed Mars mission plans
 Mars Outpost
 Mars to Stay
 Colonization of Mars
 Terraforming of Mars

Mars in popular culture 

 Mars in fiction
 John Carter of Mars
 Martians
 Mars Attacks!
 The War of the Worlds
 Films set on Mars

See also 

 Outline of astronomy
 Outline of the Solar System
 Outline of space exploration

 Astronomy on Mars
 Timekeeping on Mars
 Darian calendar

References

External links 

 
 Mars Exploration Program at NASA.gov
 Google Mars and Google Mars 3D, interactive maps of the planet
 Geody Mars, mapping site that supports NASA World Wind, Celestia, and other applications

Images
 Mars images by NASA's Planetary Photojournal
 Mars images by NASA's Mars Exploration Program
 Mars images by Malin Space Science Systems
 HiRISE image catalog by the University of Arizona

Videos
 Rotating color globe of Mars by the National Oceanic and Atmospheric Administration
 Rotating geological globe of Mars by the United States Geological Survey
  by The Science Channel (2012, 4:31)
 Flight Into Mariner Valley by Arizona State University

Cartographic resources
 Mars nomenclature and quadrangle maps with feature names by the United States Geological Survey
 Geological map of Mars by the United States Geological Survey
 Viking orbiter photomap by Eötvös Loránd University
 Mars Global Surveyor topographical map by Eötvös Loránd University

Mars
Mars